The hedgehog's dilemma, or sometimes the porcupine dilemma, is a metaphor about the challenges of human intimacy. It describes a situation in which a group of hedgehogs seek to move close to one another to share heat during cold weather. They must remain apart, however, as they cannot avoid hurting one another with their sharp spines. Though they all share the intention of a close reciprocal relationship, this may not occur, for reasons they cannot avoid.

Arthur Schopenhauer conceived this metaphor to describe what he considers to be the state of the individual in relation to others in society. The hedgehog's dilemma suggests that despite goodwill, human intimacy cannot occur without substantial mutual harm, and what results is cautious behavior and weak relationships. With the hedgehog's dilemma, one is recommended to use moderation in affairs with others both because of self-interest, as well as out of consideration for others. The hedgehog's dilemma is used to explain self-imposed isolation.

Schopenhauer

The concept originates in the following parable from the German philosopher Arthur Schopenhauer's Parerga and Paralipomena, Volume II, Chapter XXXI, Section 396:One cold winter's day, a number of porcupines huddled together quite closely in order through their mutual warmth to prevent themselves from being frozen. But they soon felt the effect of their quills on one another, which made them again move apart. Now when the need for warmth once more brought them together, the drawback of the quills was repeated so that they were tossed between two evils, until they had discovered the proper distance from which they could best tolerate one another. Thus the need for society which springs from the emptiness and monotony of men's lives, drives them together; but their many unpleasant and repulsive qualities and insufferable drawbacks once more drive them apart. The mean distance which they finally discover, and which enables them to endure being together, is politeness and good manners. Whoever does not keep to this, is told in England to 'keep his distance.' By virtue thereof, it is true that the need for mutual warmth will be only imperfectly satisfied, but on the other hand, the prick of the quills will not be felt. Yet whoever has a great deal of internal warmth of his own will prefer to keep away from society in order to avoid giving or receiving trouble or annoyance.

Freud
It entered the realm of psychology after the tale was discovered and adopted by Sigmund Freud. Schopenhauer's tale was quoted by Freud in a footnote to his 1921 work Group Psychology and the Analysis of the Ego. Freud stated, of his trip to the United States in 1909: "I am going to the USA to catch sight of a wild porcupine and to give some lectures."

Social psychological research
The dilemma has received empirical attention within the contemporary psychological sciences. Jon Maner and his colleagues (Nathan DeWall, Roy Baumeister, and Mark Schaller) referred to Schopenhauer's "porcupine problem" when interpreting results from experiments examining how people respond to ostracism. The study showed that participants who experienced social exclusion were more likely to seek out new social bonds with others.

In popular culture
The parable of the hedgehog's dilemma has been referenced in several works of media, including the show Neon Genesis Evangelion.

The award-winning short film Henry is a modernist version of the hedgehog's dilemma: in this story, the hedgehog eventually finds social comfort through a turtle, that is, a fellow social creature who is invulnerable to the hedgehog's spines. In the context of the original dilemma, this can be taken to represent the need for variability in human social preferences.

The Japanese vocaloid song Harinezumi by Tota Kasamura is about the Hedgehog's dilemma.

See also

List of paradoxes
Social isolation

References

Arthur Schopenhauer
Interpersonal relationships
Dilemmas
Hedgehogs in popular culture
Metaphors referring to animals
Philosophy of life